In the Netherlands the Ministers without portfolio are Dutch ministers that does not head a specific ministry, but assumes the same power and responsibilities as a minister that does. The minister is responsible for a specific part of another minister's policy field. In that sense, a minister without portfolio is comparable to a State Secretary (staatssecretaris) a junior minister in Dutch politics, who also falls under another ministry and is responsible for a specific part of that minister's policy field. However, one distinct difference is that a minister without portfolio is a member of the Council of Ministers and can vote in it, whereas a state secretary is not. The minister for development cooperation has always been a minister without portfolio.

List of Ministers without Portfolio in the Second Gerbrandy cabinet

List of Ministers without Portfolio in the Third Gerbrandy cabinet

List of Ministers without Portfolio in the Schermerhorn–Drees cabinet

List of Ministers without Portfolio in the First Beel cabinet

List of Ministers without Portfolio in the Drees–Van Schaik cabinet

List of Ministers without Portfolio in the First Drees cabinet

List of Ministers without Portfolio in the Second Drees cabinet

List of Ministers without Portfolio in the De Quay cabinet

List of Ministers without Portfolio in the Marijnen cabinet

List of Ministers without Portfolio in the Cals cabinet

List of Ministers without Portfolio in the Zijlstra cabinet

List of Ministers without Portfolio in the De Jong cabinet

List of Ministers without Portfolio in the First Biesheuvel cabinet

List of Ministers without Portfolio in the Second Biesheuvel cabinet

List of Ministers without Portfolio in the Den Uyl cabinet

List of Ministers without Portfolio in the First Van Agt cabinet

List of Ministers without Portfolio in the Second Van Agt cabinet

List of Ministers without Portfolio in the Third Van Agt cabinet

List of Ministers without Portfolio in the First Lubbers cabinet

List of Ministers without Portfolio in the Second Lubbers cabinet

List of Ministers without Portfolio in the Third Lubbers cabinet

List of Ministers without Portfolio in the First Kok cabinet

List of Ministers without Portfolio in the Second Kok cabinet

List of Ministers without Portfolio in the First Balkenende cabinet

List of Ministers without Portfolio in the Second Balkenende cabinet

List of Ministers without Portfolio in the Third Balkenende cabinet

List of Ministers without Portfolio in the Fourth Balkenende cabinet

List of Ministers without Portfolio in the First Rutte cabinet

List of Ministers without Portfolio in the Second Rutte cabinet

List of Ministers without Portfolio in the Third Rutte cabinet

See also
 Minister for Foreign Trade and Development Cooperation

References